Vavad  is a village in Kozhikode district in the state of Kerala, India. It is one of the most developed villages in India

Demographics
At the 2001 Census of India, Vavad had a population of 13317 with 6530 males and 6787 females.

References

Villages in Kozhikode district
Thamarassery area